The Nanny is a 1965 British suspense film directed by Seth Holt, and starring Bette Davis, Wendy Craig, and Jill Bennett. Davis appears as a supposedly devoted nanny caring for a 10-year-old boy recently discharged from a home for disturbed children. It is based on the novel of the same title by Evelyn Piper (a pseudonym for Merriam Modell) and was scored by Richard Rodney Bennett. It was made by Hammer Film Productions at Elstree Studios.

Plot 
Joey spends two years at a school for emotionally disturbed children after being blamed for drowning his younger sister Susy. The school's headmaster informs Joey's father, Bill, that his son harbours an intense dislike of middle-aged women. This extends to the family's nanny, whom Joey distrusts and disrespects.

When Joey returns home, he refuses to eat the meals Nanny prepares because he suspects she may poison him. He abandons the room Nanny has decorated for him and moves to one with a strong lock on its door. Joey's rude behaviour upsets his neurotic mother, Virginia, who is prone to melancholy and crying spells, still grieving over the death of Susy. Nanny comforts Virginia as she did when she cared for her and her sister Pen when they were children.

In a flashback, Nanny leaves the house for an appointment. Joey is playing by himself with his father's model railway. Susy threatens to tell their parents on Joey for being disobedient because he is not supposed to. She wants to play with him, but he tells her to go away.

She goes into the bathroom to play and accidentally drops her doll in the bath. She tries to retrieve it by reaching behind the shower curtain but falls into the bath. Nanny enters the bathroom and absentmindedly turns on the tap by reaching through the closed shower curtain without looking inside. Unable to summon Susy for her bath, Nanny searches for her. When she returns to the bathroom, she finds Susy floating face down in the water. Her mind snaps and she bathes the girl's lifeless body. Joey witnesses this but Nanny does not see him. Eventually, she realizes that Joey knows that she accidentally caused Susy's death.

Joey persuades Bobbie Medman, the 14-year-old daughter of a doctor living in the flat above, to witness a cruel prank: he places a doll face down in the bath, opens the tap, and persuades Nanny to turn the spigot off. She is aghast when she sees the floating doll because it reminds her of finding Susy after she drowned in the bath. Later, Joey appears at Bobbie's window dripping wet and claims that Nanny tried to drown him.

Bill is a Queen's Messenger who is frequently away on business. He flies to Beirut for a few days after seeing Joey's hostility toward Nanny fail to subside. Joey refuses to eat the steak and kidney pie Nanny has cooked for him, so she spoon-feeds Virginia the pie which she has laced with poison. After Virginia falls ill and is taken to hospital, Joey is blamed for the incident. Joey's Aunt Pen, who has a weak heart as a result of childhood rheumatic fever, comes to babysit.

After coming back from the hospital Pen wakes during the night and finds Nanny standing outside Joey's door holding a pillow. Nanny claims the pillow is an extra one for Joey, but Pen remembers she would not allow her and Virginia to have pillows when they were children. Suspecting Nanny intends to suffocate Joey, Pen asks her what happened earlier when Joey emerged from the bathroom soaking wet. She gets over-excited and has a heart attack, but Nanny snatches her heart medicine from her.

As Pen lays dying, Nanny tells her she was a single mother who was called to the deathbed of her daughter, Janet, who died from an illegal abortion. Already shaken, she returned home to find Susy's body, which drove her over the edge. Nanny says she cannot let Joey live for fear that someone may believe his story and put nannies' livelihoods at risk because people entrust their children to them. When Nanny finishes her speech, Pen is dead.

Nanny tries to enter Joey's bedroom, but his alarm system wakes him and he tries to escape. Nanny grabs him by the ankle, causing him to fall and knocking him unconscious. She carries him into the bath and fills it with water. Soon the memory of finding Susy's body returns and Nanny pulls Joey from the bath.

Dr Medman visits Virginia's hospital room and explains that Nanny is mentally ill and will receive long-term care. Virginia discovers Joey is at the hospital and would like to see her. She tells him she knows everything about Nanny. Joey is no longer sullen; instead he hugs his mother and behaves like a joyful ten-year-old boy.

Cast

Release

Critical response
The Nanny has been well received by critics. It holds a 91% approval rating on movie review aggregator website Rotten Tomatoes based on eleven reviews.

AllMovie called it "one of Hammer Films' better non-supernatural outings of the 1960s".

Box office
According to Fox records, the film needed to earn $1,300,000 in rentals to break even and made $2,175,000, meaning it made a profit.

The movie screening rights were sold to American television for nearly $400,000.

See also
 Psycho-biddy
 Whatever Happened to Baby Jane?

References

External links

 

1965 films
1960s psychological thriller films
20th Century Fox films
British black-and-white films
British thriller films
Films shot at Associated British Studios
Films directed by Seth Holt
Films scored by Richard Rodney Bennett
Films set in London
Films shot in London
Hammer Film Productions films
Films with screenplays by Jimmy Sangster
Films produced by Jimmy Sangster
Films about nannies
American black-and-white films
American thriller films
1960s English-language films
1960s American films
1960s British films